Charles W. Robinson (born 1946) was the state treasurer of Arkansas from 2013 to 2015. He was appointed on May 29, 2013, by Democratic Governor Mike Beebe after the resignation of former treasurer Martha Shoffner a week earlier on charges of corruption. Robinson served the remainder of Shoffner's term and was not eligible to run for election to the office in 2014. Dennis Milligan succeeded Robinson as state treasurer, effective January 13, 2015.

Robinson is originally from Harrison, Arkansas, and has an accounting degree from Arkansas Tech University in Russellville and an MBA from the University of Arkansas at Fayetteville. He had been a state employee for thirty-four years in the Division of Legislative Audit, including twenty-eight years as the legislative auditor, from which he retired in 2007.  Robinson lives in North Little Rock, Arkansas.

On November 4, 2014, Republican Dennis Milligan won a general election contest against Democrat Karen Garcia and Libertarian Chris Hayes; Milligan succeeded Robinson as state treasurer on January 13, 2015.

References

1946 births
Living people
State treasurers of Arkansas
Arkansas Democrats
Arkansas Tech University alumni
People from Harrison, Arkansas
Politicians from North Little Rock, Arkansas
University of Arkansas alumni